The Quzhou dialect (衢州話; pronounced  in the Quzhou dialect) is a dialect of Wu Chinese spoken in Quzhou, China.

Phonology

Initials

Finals

Tones
The Quzhou dialect is considered to have seven tones. However, since the tone split from Middle Chinese, characters still depend on the voicing of the initial consonant. These constitute just three phonemic tones: ping, shang, and qu. (Ru syllables are phonemically toneless.)

Grammar

Sentence structure

The first example can be compared with Japanese: あなたは私の友達だよ。(anata wa watashi no tomodachi dayo.) Here, 啘 resembles Japanese だよ (dayo).

Lexicon

Pronouns

 我  1st person singular
 你  2nd person singular
 渠[  3rd person singular
 我達 , 我拉  (我耷) 1st person plural
 你達 , 你拉 , 爾耷-  2nd person plural
 渠達 , 渠拉  (渠耷) 3rd person plural

References

Wu Chinese